Cannabis Law Reform (CLEAR), formerly the Legalise Cannabis Alliance, is a United Kingdom lobby group which campaigns to end the prohibition of cannabis. The group was founded in 1997 and reformed as CLEAR in 2011. It campaigned in a number of elections until it was statutorily de-registered by the Electoral Commission in November 2013.

History

Legalise Cannabis Alliance

The Legalise Cannabis Alliance (LCA) campaigned for the legalisation of cannabis for all purposes, including medicinal use, as biomass, hemp-based products, and recreational drug use. They fielded candidates in elections to the House of Commons and local government.

The party had origins in a pressure group formed in Norwich. It was registered as a political party in March 1999, after Howard Marks had stood as a Legalise Cannabis candidate in four different constituencies at the 1997 general election: Norwich North, Norwich South, Southampton Test and Neath.

The party used a Cannabis leaf image as its emblem and Cannabis : legalise and utilise served as its election manifesto.

The first official LCA candidate in a parliamentary election was former mayor of Carlisle Colin Paisley in the November 1999 by election in the Kensington and Chelsea constituency. He took 141 (0.7%) of the votes. The second was Derrick Large in the May 2000 Romsey byelection, who took 417 (1.1%) of the votes.

In local elections in 2000, the party stood five candidates in Norwich and one in Peterborough, and the party stood frequently in local elections.

In the 2005 general election the LCA stood 18 candidates in 21 constituencies. This was eight more than in the 2001 general election, but included only six that had been contested in that previous election. In all these six constituencies the LCA suffered a fall in its share of the vote, and the average share across 21 constituencies was well down from that across the previous 13. Their best results were in Orkney and Shetland, Worthing East and Shoreham and Leigh. The LCA also stood in seven Welsh constituencies. As well as calling for the legalisation of cannabis, the manifesto in Wales included campaigning against GM food, for lower fuel tax for haulage and transport firms, and support for recycling and renewable energy.

The party met with then Home Secretary and Norwich South MP Charles Clarke in March 2006 to put their case for the legalisation of cannabis.

LCA election results

CLEAR
The members of the Legalise Cannabis Alliance voted to re-register to contest elections in February 2011. Proposals for a new identity and constitution were put to a referendum of the membership and passed in separate two votes. The party re-registered with the Electoral Commission under its new name of CLEAR Cannabis Law Reform.

The party commissioned a report by the Independent Drug Monitoring Unit, published on 14 September 2011, stating that a taxed and regulated cannabis market would save the exchequer £6.7 billion.

Peter Reynolds stood as CLEAR candidate in the 2012 Corby by-election, taking 137 votes (0.38%).

The party was statutorily de-registered by the UK Electoral Commission in November 2013.

As of 2014, the party states on their website: "We are not presently registered with the Electoral Commission as we are not currently intending to contest any elections.

See also
 Cannabis classification in the United Kingdom
 Cannabis in the United Kingdom
 Cannabis Is Safer Than Alcohol
 Cannabis political parties
 Drug policy reform
 List of political parties in the United Kingdom

References

External links
 
 The History of the LCA
 Why The Legalise Cannabis Alliance is now CLEAR, Peter Reynolds, Know Drugs website, accessed 11 October 2011

Political advocacy groups in the United Kingdom
Political campaigns in the United Kingdom
Reform in the United Kingdom
1997 establishments in the United Kingdom
Cannabis political parties of the United Kingdom
Drug policy of the United Kingdom
Political parties disestablished in 2013
Single-issue political parties in United Kingdom